Give2Asia is an international nonprofit organization that connects corporations, foundations, and individuals with charitable projects and social enterprises across Asia. Since 2001, Give2Asia has built a network of over 2,000 grant recipients and 15,000 donors in 25 countries from Afghanistan to Australia. The organization is based in San Francisco, CA. 

Give2Asia's work focuses on key issues such as healthcare, the environment, disaster preparedness and relief, and poverty alleviation. They believe that local knowledge counts: Give2Asia has a team of local staff, in- country advisors, and partners in every country where we work, ensuring projects are effective, results are transparent, and grant recipients are accountable. They work mostly with individuals, families, foundations and corporations to establish a social responsibility and philanthropy presence in Asia.

They have served as the philanthropy partner in Asia for hundreds of donors, companies, foundations, and nonprofit organizations, including Adobe Systems, Bank of America, Margaret A. Cargill Foundation, Caterpillar, Deshpande Foundation, EMC, Facebook, PEPSI, Qualcomm, Silicon Valley Community Foundation, Starbucks, State Street, Steamboat Ventures, and Synopsis. Give2Asia provides on-the-ground research in each country, including thorough due diligence on grantees, meeting U.S. regulations for international grant making, and ensuring adherence to local laws in recipient countries. They enable employee giving and matching, volunteerism, and tax-deductible giving to charitable groups in Asia from the United States or Hong Kong. Give2Asia guides projects to completion, expanding the capacity of corporate foundation and community engagement teams.

Organization

Give2Asia partners with families and foundations to support communities, their local nonprofits, and solutions to the issues they face. They also offer a Fiscal Sponsorship Program that offers Asia-based charitable and educational organizations a convenient and cost-effective way to accept tax-deductible contributions from supports in the United States. Give2Asia takes care of the day-to-day administration, accounting, and legal and reporting requirements, making it simpler for Asia-based organizations to connect to US-based donors with charitable projects in Asia. The organizational structure of Give2Asia consists of a Board of Directors, Staff, who are headquartered in San Francisco, California, and Field Advisors located all across Asia.

Breakdown of Aid

In its FY2016 annual report, from Give2Asia's documented donations 25% went to India, 23% to China, 13% to Taiwan, 7% to Indonesia and 5% each to Australia, Japan, and Nepal. The 18% remaining went to other countries within Asia. The distribution of 2016 by causes was divided with 31% of funds going towards Education, 27% to Livelihood, 18% to Health, 9% to Environment, 7% to Disaster Response and 9% to other causes.

References and Footnotes

Charities based in California
Diaspora organizations in the United States
2001 establishments in California